The Chiefdom of Lijiang was a Nakhi autonomous Tusi chiefdom that ruled Lijiang during Yuan, Ming and Qing dynasty.

History
At first, Lijiang was ruled by Yuexi Zhao (越巂詔). Later, it was annexed by Nanzhao. According to legend, ancestor Lijiang chieftains was a Mongol.

Mongolians invaded the Dali in 1253. Moubao Acong (牟保阿琮), the chieftain of Lijiang, surrendered to the Mongol Empire. His son was granted the title Lijiang Lu Xuanweishi (麗江路宣慰使) by Yuan dynasty.

After the Ming dynasty came into power, the chieftain Ajia Ade swore allegiance to the Ming dynasty. Hongwu Emperor gave him the Chinese name "Mu De" (木得). From then on, chieftains of Lijiang also had Chinese name; they started to use Chinese surname Mu (木). They received the official position "Magistrate of Lijiang" (麗江知府) from Chinese emperor.

Chieftains of Lijiang helped Ming China in Ming conquest of Yunnan and Luchuan–Pingmian campaigns. They also seized many territories from neighbouring chiefdoms.

Lijiang saw its golden age during Mu Zeng's reign; It became the most powerful in present-day southwestern China. Lijiang attacked Gyalrong people frequently, and invaded Kingdom of Chakla. King of Chakla had to appeal for China's help. However, Mu Zeng promised to Chinese that he would offer soldiers in Ming–Manchu War. It was a successful diplomatic effort, Ming China did nothing but send an envoy to Lijiang to call for a cease-fire.

After Manchu conquest of China, chieftain Mu Yi (木懿) swore allegiance to Manchu Qing dynasty. In 1673, Wu Sangui revolted against Qing dynasty. Mu Yi rejected to swear allegiance to Wu Sangui, and was thrown into prison. Mu Yi was released after the rebellion was put down, and restored.

The Chiefdom of Lijiang was abolished by Yongzheng Emperor in 1723. Since then, the magistrates of Lijiang were all Han Chinese; they were appointed by Chinese emperor directly. The leader of Mu family was granted the title Tǔ Tōngpàn (土通判) from Chinese court, but had no real power.

Culture
Lijiang culture was deeply influenced by both Chinese and Tibetan culture. Nakhi people accepted Confucianism. Many chieftains were well-educated. Mu Tai (木泰),  (木公), Mu Gao (木高), Mu Qing (木青), Mu Zeng (木增) and Mu Jing (木靖) were good at writing Chinese poetry.

In 1639, Xu Xiake, a Chinese travel writer, came to Lijiang. Xu was warmly welcomed by Mu Zeng.

Many Nakhi people also accepted the Tibetan Buddhism. Chieftain Mu Zeng provided shelter for Chöying Dorje, 10th Karmapa.

Old Town of Lijiang was registered on the UNESCO World Heritage List on December 4, 1997.

List of Lijiang chieftains

See also
Chiefdom of Yongning

References

Sources
  
 
 
 

Tusi in Yunnan
Lijiang
States and territories established in the 13th century
States and territories disestablished in the 18th century